Right whale may refer to:

Baleen whale taxa:
 the taxonomic family Balaenidae which consists of two genera Eubalaena and the Balaena (bowhead whale)
 the genus Eubalaena or any of the three species currently recognized in that genus:
 North Atlantic right whale (E. glacialis)
 North Pacific right whale (E. japonica)
 Southern right whale (E. australis)
Pygmy right whale (Caperea marginata) currently classified in its own family Neobalaenidae

Other:
Right Whale Bay, South Georgia
Right whale dolphin - two species of dolphins in the genus Lissodelphis
Northern right whale dolphin
Southern right whale dolphin

Animal common name disambiguation pages